María Castro Jato (born 30 November 1981) is a Spanish actress, TV presenter, dancer and rhythmic gymnast.

Career
She studies sports science in the Pontevedra Campus. She was runner-up at the Campeonato de España Individual de Gimnasia Rítmica. On 10 January 2010 she played Mollie Ralston in the stage The Mousetrap, by Agatha Christie, along with Gorka Otxoa, Leo Rivera, Paco Churruca, Aroa Gimeno, Álvaro Roig, Maribel Ripoll and Guillermo Muñoz. On 3 September 2012 she appeared in a topless photo on Interviú. In 2013 she appeared simultaneously in Vive cantando and Tierra de lobos.

Personal life 
On 15 September 2018, she married the actor José Manuel Villalba. On 22 June 2016, she gave birth to the couple's first child, a girl, whom they called Maia Villalba Castro. On 1 October 2020, she gave birth to the couple's second child, a girl, whom they called Olivia Villalba Castro.

Awards and nominees
In 2009 she was awarded by the Premios Ondas and she won the Premio Carabela de Oro de Baiona. In 2014 she won Best Actress for the TV series Vive cantando.

Filmography 

Television

References

External links

 
 

1981 births
University of Vigo alumni
Sportspeople from Vigo
Actresses from Galicia (Spain)
Spanish television actresses
Spanish television presenters
Spanish rhythmic gymnasts
21st-century Spanish actresses
Living people
Spanish women television presenters